The Patsy Hankins Trophy is a women's amateur golf competition on the model of the Ryder Cup, corresponding to the men's Bonallack Trophy. The competition opposes every two years a European team and a team representing Asia/Pacific, and the venue alternates between courses in Europe and Asia/Pacific. 

The Trophy is named after Patsy Hankins (1945–2015), one of the most respected golf administrators New Zealand has produced. The first competition took place in 2016 at Vidago Palace Golf Course, Portugal.

Format
The Patsy Hankins Trophy involves various match play competitions between players selected from two teams of twelve representing Europe and Asia-Pacific. It takes place over three days, with a total of 32 matches being played, all matches being over 18 holes. The first two days comprise five foursomes matches and five four-ball matches. On the final day, there are 12 singles matches, when all twelve players compete.

The winner of each match scores a point for his team, with a half point each for any match that is tied after the 18 holes. The winning team is determined by cumulative total points. In the event of a tie (16 points each) the Patsy Hankins Trophy is retained by the previous holder.

A foursomes match is a competition between two teams of two golfers. On a particular hole the golfers on the same team take alternate shots playing the same ball. One team member tees off on all the odd-numbered holes, and the other on all the even-numbered holes. Each hole is won by the team that completes the hole in the fewest shots. A fourball match is also a competition between two teams of two golfers, but all four golfers play their own ball throughout the round rather than alternating shots. The better score of the two golfers in a team determines the team's score on a particular hole; the score of the other member of the team is not counted. Each hole is won by the team whose individual golfer has the lowest score. A singles match is a standard match play competition between two golfers.

Team qualification and selection

European Team selection
The World Amateur Golf Rankings are used as the main reference for the selection process, in addition to a small number of players selected by the captain (known as "captain's picks"). No more than two players may be selected from the same country.

Results

Appearances
The following are those who have played in at least one of the matches.

Europe
  Gudrun Bjorgvinsdottir 2018
  Zhen Bontan 2018
  Gioia Carpinelli 2016
  Lucrezia Colombotto Rosso 2016
  Bianca Fabrizio 2016, 2018
  Blanca Fernández García-Poggio 2018
  Annabell Fuller 2018
  Laura Fünfstück 2016
  Paula Grant 2018
  Frida Kinhult 2016, 2018
  Amanda Linnér 2018
  Clarisse Louis 2018
  Thomsen Puk Lyng 2016
  Meghan MacLaren 2016
  Elena Moosmann 2018
  Luque Maria Parra 2016
  Luna Sobrón Galmés 2016
  Emma Spitz 2016
  Puk Lyng Thomsen 2018
  Albane Valenzuela 2016
  Isobel Wardle 2018
  Chloe Williams 2016

Asia/Pacific
  Julianne Alvarez 2016
  Hina Aragaki 2016
  Ya-Chun Chiang 2018
  Tiffany Chan 2016
  Choi Hye-jin 2016
  Hannah Green 2016
  Nasa Hataoka 2016
  Yu-Chiang Hou 2018
  Wenyung Keh 2016
  Grace Kim 2018
  Kwon Seo-yun 2018
  Wenbo Liu 2018
  Du Mohan 2018
  Yuna Nishimura 2018
  Park Hyun-kyung 2016
  Tian Qi 2016
  Ryu Hae-ran 2018
  Riri Sadoyama 2018
  Yuka Saso 2018
  Princess Mary Superal 2016
  Patty Tavatanakit 2016, 2018
  Atthaya Thitikul 2018
  Han-Hsuan Yu 2016

References

Team golf tournaments
Recurring sporting events established in 2016